CD154, also called CD40 ligand or CD40L, is a protein that is primarily expressed on activated T cells and is a member of the TNF superfamily of molecules.  It binds to CD40 on antigen-presenting cells (APC), which leads to many effects depending on the target cell type. In total CD40L has three binding partners: CD40, α5β1 integrin and αIIbβ3. CD154 acts as a costimulatory molecule and is particularly important on a subset of T cells called T follicular helper cells (TFH cells). On TFH cells, CD154 promotes B cell maturation and function by engaging CD40 on the B cell surface and therefore facilitating cell-cell communication. A defect in this gene results in an inability to undergo immunoglobulin class switching and is associated with hyper IgM syndrome. Absence of CD154 also stops the formation of germinal centers and therefore prohibiting antibody affinity maturation, an important process in the adaptive immune system.

History 

In 1991, three groups reported discovering CD154.  Seth Lederman, Michael Yellin, and Leonard Chess at Columbia University generated a murine monoclonal antibody, 5c8, that inhibited contact-dependent T cell helper function in human cells and which characterized a 32 kDa surface protein transiently expressed on activated CD4+ T cells.  Richard Armitage at Immunex cloned a cDNA encoding CD154 by screening an expression library with CD40-Ig.  Randolph Noelle at Dartmouth Medical School generated an antibody that bound a 39 kDa protein on murine T cells and inhibited helper function.  Noelle contested Lederman's patent, but the challenge (called an interference) was rejected on all counts

Expression 

CD40 ligand (CD154) is primarily expressed on activated CD4+ T lymphocytes but is also found in a soluble form.  While CD40L was originally described on T lymphocytes, its expression has since been found on a wide variety of cells, including platelets, mast cells, macrophages, basophils, NK cells, B lymphocytes, as well as non-haematopoietic cells (smooth muscle cells, endothelial cells, and epithelial cells).

Specific effects on cells 
CD40L plays a central role in costimulation and regulation of the immune response via T cell priming and activation of CD40-expressing immune cells. At least 46 disease-causing mutations in this gene have been discovered.

Macrophages 

In the macrophage, the primary signal for activation is IFN-γ from Th1 type CD4 T cells. The secondary signal is CD40L on the T cell, which binds CD40 on the macrophage cell surface. As a result, the macrophage expresses more CD40 and TNF receptors on its surface, which helps increase the level of activation. The activated macrophage can then destroy phagocytosed bacteria and produce more cytokines.

B cells 

B cells can present antigens to a specialized group of helper T cells called TFH cells. If an activated TFH cell recognizes the peptide presented by the B cell, the CD40L on the  T cell binds to the B cell's CD40, causing B cell activation. The T cell also produces IL-4, which directly influences B cells. As a result of this stimulation, the B cell can undergo rapid cellular division to form a germinal center where antibody isotype switching and affinity maturation occurs, as well as their differentiation to plasma cells and memory B cells. The end-result is a B cell that is able to mass-produce specific antibodies against an antigenic target.
Early evidence for these effects were that in CD40 or CD154 deficient mice, there is little class switching or germinal centre formation, and immune responses are severely inhibited.

Endothelial cells
Activation of endothelial cells by CD40L (e.g. from activated platelets) leads to reactive oxygen species production, as well as chemokine and cytokine production, and expression of adhesion molecules such as E-selectin, ICAM-1, and VCAM-1. This inflammatory reaction in endothelial cells promotes recruitment of leukocytes to lesions and may potentially promote atherogenesis. CD40L has shown to be a potential biomarker for atherosclerotic instability.

Interactions 

CD154 has been shown to interact with RNF128.

References

Further reading

External links 
 
 
  GeneReviews/NCBI/NIH/UW entry on X-Linked Hyper IgM Syndrome or Immunodeficiency with Hyper-IgM, Type 1

Clusters of differentiation